Laetilia zamacrella is a species of snout moth in the genus Laetilia. It was described by Harrison Gray Dyar Jr. in 1925. It is found in the US state of California.

References

Moths described in 1925
Phycitini